See also Muwatalli II

Muwatalli I was a king of the Hittites.

Biography 
Muwatalli killed his predecessor Huzziya II. He was the Chief of the Royal Bodyguard of Huzziya, but later he killed him. He may have been Huzziya's younger brother.

Muwatalli's Chief of the Royal Bodyguard was called Muwa. Muwattalli himself was killed in a palace by Himuili, the Chief of the Palace Servants, and Kantuzili, the Overseer of the Gold Chariot Fighters.

His wife was called Walanni.

External links
Reign of Muwatalli I at Hittites.info

Sources 

Hittite kings
15th-century BC rulers